Happy Couple (French:Bonheur conjugal) is a 1923 French silent film directed by Robert Saidreau.

Cast
 André Dubosc 
 Pierre Etchepare
 Denise Legeay
 Lucienne Legrand

References

Bibliography
  Eva Woods Peiró. White Gypsies: Race and Stardom in Spanish Musical Films. U of Minnesota Press, 2012.

External links

1923 films
French silent feature films
Films directed by Robert Saidreau
French black-and-white films
1920s French films